Louis Philip "Louie" Vito III (born March 20, 1988) is an Italian-American professional snowboarder. He is an Olympian, Winter X Games, and U.S. Grand Prix Champion.

Early life
Louis Vito was born in Columbus, Ohio, but grew up in the nearby city of Bellefontaine. In his teenage years, he moved to Vermont to pursue his love of snowboarding by enrolling in the Stratton Mountain School – a ski and snowboarding academy. He spent his high school years snowboarding in the morning, studying in the afternoons, and traveling to competitions when time permitted. After graduating high school, he moved to Sandy, Utah.

Career
Louie Vito has won four of the past five U.S. Snowboarding Grand Prix Overall Championships, six X Games medals, and two Winter Dew Tour Overall Championships, among many other accolades.

He rose to prominence on the professional snowboarding scene at age 17 by completing a backside 1080 at the Australian Open Snowboarding Championships – making him the first rider to pull off the complex move in an Australian competition successfully. This helped propel Vito to the top of the podium, capturing his first of two consecutive championships there.

Vito is currently the reigning Winter Dew Tour Overall Champion and U.S. Grand Prix Overall Champion.

In September 2009, Vito competed on the ninth season of Dancing With the Stars. Partnered with professional dancer Chelsie Hightower, he rehearsed for the show at the same time that he was training for the Olympics. Three months later, he represented the United States at the 21st Olympic Games in Vancouver. In 2022, Vito represented Italy in the halfpipe at the 2022 Winter Olympics in Beijing.

Charity

Each year Vito holds the "Louie Vito Rail Jam" in his hometown at Mad River Mountain. The event is held to mentor young riders who are given the opportunity to compete without an entry fee and get outfitted in Vito’s premium gear. The Rail Jam supports local charity St. Vincent De Paul through money raised from auction items and food donated to the food bank by everyone who attends.

Results
 U.S. Olympic Team Member 2010 
 Italian Olympic Team Member 2022
 Gold Medalist – Winter X Games Europe 2013
 Gold Medalist – Winter X Games Europe 2011
 Overall Champion – Dew Cup 2011/2012
 Overall Champion – Dew Cup 2010/2011
 Overall Champion – U.S. Grand Prix 2011/2012
 Overall Champion – U.S. Grand Prix 2010/2011
 Overall Champion – U.S. Grand Prix 2008/2009
 Overall Champion – U.S. Grand Prix 2007/2008
 Silver Medalist – Winter X Games Europe 2012
 Bronze Medalist – Winter X Games 2011
 Bronze Medalist – Winter X Games Europe 2010
 1st Place – Dew Tour, Snowbasin, UT 2012
 1st Place – Dew Tour, Killington, VT 2011
 1st Place – Dew Tour, Breckenridge, CO 2010
 1st Place – Grand Prix, Mammoth, CA 2012
 1st Place – Grand Prix, Copper Mtn, CO 2010
 1st Place – Grand Prix, Tamarack Mtn 2009
 1st Place – Grand Prix, Killington, VT 2008
 1st Place – Grand Prix, Copper Mtn, CO 2008
 1st Place – Grand Prix, Tamarack Mtn 2008
 1st Place – Jeep King Of the Mountain, Squaw Valley 2008
 1st Place – Garnier Fructis Pro Challenge, Australia 2006
 1st Place – Burton Australian Open 2005
 2nd Place – Burton U.S. Open 2012
 2nd Place – World Cup, Spain 2009
 2nd Place – Burton U.S. Open 2010
 2nd Place – Overall U.S. Grand Prix 2009/2010
 2nd Place – Overall U.S. Grand Prix 2006/2007
 2nd Place – Dew Tour, Breckenridge, CO 2012
 2nd Place – Dew Tour, Breckenridge, CO 2011
 2nd Place – Dew Tour, Killington, VT 2012
 2nd Place – Grand Prix, Copper Mtn, CO 2011
 2nd Place – Grand Prix, Mammoth, CA 2010
 2nd Place – Grand Prix, Boreal 2009
 2nd Place – Grand Prix, Copper Mtn, CO 2009
 2nd Place – Vans Cup Superpipe, Tahoe, CA 2008
 2nd Place – Grand Prix, Tamarac 2007
 2nd Place – Grand Prix, Mt. Bachelor 2007
 2nd Place – Burton New Zealand Open 2011
 2nd Place – Burton New Zealand Open 2006
 2nd Place – Burton Australian Open 2007
 3rd Place – World Snowboard Championships, Norway 2012
 3rd Place – Burton U.S. Open 2013
 3rd Place – Grand Prix, Copper Mtn, CO 2013
 3rd Place – Burton New Zealand Open 2010
 5th Place – Olympics, Vancouver 2010
 Dancing With The Stars, Season 9
 The Challenge: Champs vs. Pros

References

External links
 
 
 
 
 
 
 Louie Vito at EXPN Online
 Rider Info on O-Matic Snowboards
 Louie Vito Checks in For Hump Day on YoBeat.com
 US Snowboarding Team Officially Named
 Official Olympic Athlete Bio

1988 births
Living people
American male snowboarders
Olympic snowboarders of the United States
Sportspeople from Columbus, Ohio
People from Bellefontaine, Ohio
Snowboarders at the 2010 Winter Olympics
X Games athletes
The Challenge (TV series) contestants
Olympic snowboarders of Italy
Snowboarders at the 2022 Winter Olympics